The Newdigate baronetcy, of Arbury, Warwickshire, was created on 24 July 1677 in the Baronetage of England for Richard Newdigate of Arbury Hall. It became extinct on the death of the 5th Baronet on 2 December 1806.

Baronets of Arbury (1677)

Sir Richard Newdigate, 1st Baronet (1602–1678)
Sir Richard Newdigate, 2nd Baronet (1644–1709)
Sir Richard Newdigate, 3rd Baronet (1668–1727)
Sir Edward Newdigate, 4th Baronet (1716–1732)
Sir Roger Newdigate, 5th Baronet (1719–1806)

Tree of notable family members

John Newdigate of Newdigate (temp. Edward III)
William Newdigate (died 1377), MP for Surrey in 1372
John Newdigate (died 1388), MP for Surrey in 1386
Sir John Newdigate of Harefield
John Newdigate
William Newdigate (died 1465)
John Newdigate
John Newdigate (died 1528), serjeant-at-law
John Newdigate (1494–1545)
John Newdigate (1514–1565), MP for Middlesex
John Newdigate of Arbury (died 1592), MP for Middlesex
Sir John Newdigate (1570–1610), married to Anne Fitton (1574–1618)
John Newdigate (1600–1642), MP for Liverpool
Sir Richard Newdigate, 1st Baronet (1602–1678), MP for Tamworth and Lord Chief Justice
Sir Richard Newdigate, 2nd Baronet (1644–1710), MP for Warwickshire
Sir Richard Newdigate, 3rd Baronet (1668–1727)
Sir Edward Newdigate, 4th Baronet (1716–1732)
Sir Roger Newdigate, 5th Baronet (1719–1806), MP for Middlesex and Oxford University; namesake of the Newdigate Prize
Juliana Newdigate, married to John Ludford of Ansley Hall (1707–1775)
John Newdigate Ludford (died 1822)
Elizabeth Juliana Newdigate Ludford (died 1859), married to Sir John Newdigate-Ludford-Chetwode, 5th Baronet (1788–1873)
Francis Newdigate of Kirk Hallam
Millicent Newdigate, married to William Parker of Salford Priors
Francis Parker Newdigate of Kirk Hallam and West Hallam (died 1755)
Francis Parker Newdigate (1774–1862)
Lieutenant-Colonel Francis William Newdigate (1822–1893)
Sir Francis Alexander Newdigate Newdegate (1862–1936), MP for Nuneaton and Tamworth; Governor of Tasmania and Western Australia
Lucia Newdigate Newdegate (died 1982), married to Maurice FitzRoy (1897–1976), who adopted the name Newdegate
Francis FitzRoy Newdegate, 3rd Viscount Daventry (1921–2000)
Lieutenant-General Sir Edward Newdigate Newdegate (1825–1902)
Alfred Newdigate (born 1829)
Bernard Henry Newdigate (1869–1944), author
Lieutenant-General Sir Henry Richard Legge Newdigate (1832–1908)
Charles Parker of Harefield (died 1795)
Charles Parker Newdigate Newdegate (died 1833)
Charles Newdigate Newdegate (1816–1887), MP for North Warwickshire
Thomas Newdigate of Hawton (died 1723), purchased the Newdigate House in Nottingham
Richard Newdigate (1679–1745), MP for Newark
Francis Newdigate (1519–1582), MP for Great Bedwyn, Chippenham and Middlesex
Nicholas Newdigate (born 1520), MP for Westminster
Robert Newdigate (1528–1584), MP for Buckingham and Berwick-upon-Tweed
Robert Newdigate (died 1613), MP for Grampound and Buckingham
William Newdigate (1495–1530), MP for Great Bedwyn
Sebastian Newdigate (1500–1535), Carthusian monk

See also
Viscount Daventry

External links
Pedigree of Newdigate

Newdigate
1677 establishments in England